Logan Township is a township in Clay County, Iowa, USA.  As of the 2000 census, its population was 166.

History
Logan Township was created in 1882.

Geography
According to the USGS, it contains one cemetery, Logan Township.

Elk Lake is within this township.

Notes

References
 USGS Geographic Names Information System (GNIS)

External links
 US-Counties.com
 City-Data.com

Townships in Clay County, Iowa
Townships in Iowa